Malfador Machinations was a small game company based in Santa Rosa, California. They were best known for their Space Empires series.

Brief history
Malfador Machinations was created by Aaron Hall to publish Space Empires II, the sequel to his self-produced 4X game, Space Empires, which was released two years earlier in 1993. Space Empires II was a strong success, often being included in limited form in shareware collections, including Romtech's best selling Galaxy of Games series. On September 6, 2002 Malfador Machinations broke with its reputation for space themed games by releasing a hack-n-slash role-playing game entitled Dungeon Odyssey, but this was not as successful as the Space Empires games and never received a sequel.

On April 5, 2006, Malfador Machinations was acquired by Strategy First.

Malfador's last game was Space Captain, which was released to the Google Play store in 2014. While it continued many concepts from the Space Empires series, it was more focused on elements of combat and exploration rather than the micromanagement that the series had been known for, and is the last release from the company.

Games

Space Empires II (1995)
Space Empires III (1997)
Space Empires IV (2000)
Dungeon Odyssey (2002)
Space Empires: Starfury (2003)
Space Empires V (2006)

World Supremacy (2010)
Space Captain (2014)

References

External links
 Official site, (offline) via Internet Archive

1995 establishments in California
2006 disestablishments in California
American companies established in 1995
Companies based in Santa Rosa, California
Companies based in Sonoma County, California
Space Empires
Video game companies established in 1995
Video game companies disestablished in 2006
Defunct video game companies of the United States
Video game development companies